José Ignacio Zahínos Sánchez (born 1 December 1977) is a Spanish retired footballer. Mainly a defensive midfielder, he was able to operate as a central defender.

The late bloomer's career was greatly hampered by injuries, as he only played an average of ten matches per season during ten years as a professional.

Club career
Born in Madrid, Zahínos' career began with CD Yuncos in the regional leagues. In 1999, after a successful trial at CP Amorós, he joined Atlético Madrid's reserves, and made two appearances for the first team in 2000–01's second division.

Zahínos would feature very rarely for Atlético, however, serving four loan stints in the second level until June 2007 in the process. He made his La Liga debut on 29 May 2005, playing the last 16 minutes of a 2–2 home draw against Getafe CF.

In 2007–08, Zahínos signed with top-tier club Recreativo de Huelva on a two-year deal, but had his season cut short due to a serious knee injury, sustained in a 1–0 away win over CA Osasuna in April 2008. Due to this, he missed the entirety of the following campaign, eventually being released by the Andalusians in the summer of 2009.

Zahínos retired shortly after, starting as a coach in Atlético Madrid's youth academy.

References

External links

1977 births
Living people
Footballers from Madrid
Spanish footballers
Association football midfielders
Association football utility players
La Liga players
Segunda División players
Segunda División B players
Atlético Madrid B players
Atlético Madrid footballers
Universidad de Las Palmas CF footballers
Real Jaén footballers
Elche CF players
Albacete Balompié players
Recreativo de Huelva players